The cuisine of Papua New Guinea are the traditional varied foods found in the eastern part of the New Guinea island. Approximately 80% of the population is reliant on subsistence agriculture, so a large percentage of food energy and protein consumed in Papua New Guinea is produced locally, while the balance is imported. The staple foods in Papua New Guinea includes root crops, bananas, and sago. Papua New Guinea's diet is largely vegetarian, especially in the Gulf and Highlands regions.

Mumu is a traditional method of cooking large quantities of food throughout Papua New Guinea, as well as other islands in the Pacific. It consists of an earth oven that is filled with hot coal or stones, that may be placed in different orientations, and subsequently cooked for a lengthy period of time. Despite the presence of advent ovens in Papua New Guinea, mumu is still prevalent at household level.

Beverages
Along with other islands in the western Pacific, kava is usually made into a drink by mixing the root of the crop with water. It is a popular and non-alcoholic beverage. Coffee is Papua New Guinea's second largest agricultural export, after oil palm, and is majorly grown in the Highlands Region. Hence, coffee is a widely consumed beverage in the country. Apart from non-alcoholic drinks, beer is an alcoholic beverage that is favored among many Papua New Guineans.

Staples
Sago is a common and essential part of Papua New Guinean cuisine, as the starch ingredient is included in several traditional dishes, such as pancakes and pudding. Sago is in the form of flour usually extracted from the palm tree. Staples of the Papua New Guinean diet include karuka, sweet potato (kaukau), cassava, breadfruit (ulu), and coconuts. Coconut cream is a delicacy often found in numerous local dishes of Papua New Guinea. Coastal regions traditionally use coconut milk and cream as a cooking medium, while the Highlands regions do not. Coconut oil is used on special occasions in the coastal regions.

Meat proteins are occasionally consumed in Papua New Guinea. However, for people residing in coastal areas, seafood forms a substantial part of their diet. Pork is regarded as a celebratory meat in Papua New Guinea, and is prepared on special occasions, including Christmas feasts.

Notable dishes 

 Mumu is regarded as the national dish of Papua New Guinea. It is composed of pork, sweet potato, rice, and vegetables. Mumu is an example of a balanced dish composed of the two bases, crops (including starch) and meat. The dish is named after the earth oven used traditionally.
Chicken pot is a dish consisting of chicken that has been stewed with mixed vegetables and coconut cream.
 Kokoda is a dish consisting of fish that is cooked in a lime-coconut sauce. The dish is similar to ceviche. Kokoda is also present in Fijian cuisine.
Saksak are dumplings composed of banana, ground sago, and sugar mixed and wrapped in a banana leaf, and are subsequently steamed.
Dia is a dessert composed of sago and bananas cooked in coconut cream. Sugar is not added in some cooking exceptions. Instead, sweeter bananas are used to lend sweetness to the dish.

Culinary influences
The European invasion of Papua New Guinea, beginning in the 16th century, was the first foreign introduction to the local cuisine. European settlers imported livestock and crops to the region in the 19th century, which served significant commercial value. The cuisine and traditions of Papua New Guinea have assimilation with Indonesian New Guinea and other Pacific nations. The dish kokoda—composed of fish cooked in a sauce of lime and coconut—is also present in Fijian cuisine.

Fast food
Few fast food chains operate in Papua New Guinea. However, fast food chains operating in Papua New Guinea include Hog's Breath Cafe (an Australian steakhouse chain), Big Rooster (a locally-owned chicken shop chain) and Eagle Boys (an Australian pizzeria chain). There are no large American fast food chains in Papua New Guinea, all of them are locally-owned or Australian-owned.

See also 

Oceanic cuisine
Culture of Papua New Guinea

References